The diving competition at the 1966 British Empire and Commonwealth Games in Kingston, Jamaica counted a total number of four medal events: two events for both men and women.

Australia missed out on a clean sweep of silver medals when Beverly Boys of Canada beat Australia's Susan Knight in the women's 3 metre springboard by a score of just 0.02. Australia also missed out on a gold medal by the same score of just 0.2 in the women's 10 metre platform, with England's Joy Newman finishing just ahead of Australia's Robyn Bradshaw.

Medal table

Medalists

Results

Men

Women

References
Citations

Sources
 

1966
1966 in water sports
1966 British Empire and Commonwealth Games events